Gjorče Petrov is a neighbourhood in the City of Skopje, North Macedonia, and the seat of Gjorče Petrov Municipality.

Demographics
As of the 2021 census, Gjorče Petrov had 34,040 residents with the following ethnic composition:
Macedonians 27,506
Persons for whom data are taken from administrative sources 2,659
Roma 1,037
Serbs 854
Albanians 671
Bosniaks 452
Turks 271
Vlachs 148
Others 442

According to the 2002 census, the village had a total of 9,041 inhabitants. Ethnic groups in the village include:
Macedonians 8,119
Serbs 453
Albanians 124
Bosniaks 54
Vlachs 45
Romani 39
Turks 39
Others 168

Sports
Local football club FK Makedonija have won the Macedonian league title once.

References

External links

Ǵorče Petrov Municipality
Neighbourhoods of Skopje